Nuno Vieira Campos (born 13 June 1993) is a Portuguese professional footballer who plays for S.C.U. Torreense as a right back.

He began his career at Nacional, playing 114 games and earning promotion from the second tier twice.

Club career
Born in Funchal, Madeira, Campos played from the age of 8 at hometown side C.D. Nacional. He made his professional debut on 9 January 2013 in a dead rubber Taça da Liga group fixture against G.D. Estoril Praia, in which he was one of three young debutants in a 1–0 home win. Eighteen days later he made his Primeira Liga debut in a 2–0 away victory over Vitória de Setúbal, as a 56th-minute substitute for Miguel Rodrigues.

Campos featured rarely for Nacional over the ensuing years. After their relegation in 2017, he played all but one games the following season to promote immediately as champions, and scored his only goal for the Alvinegros on 18 March to open a 3–0 defeat of Varzim S.C. at the Estádio da Madeira. On 15 July 2020, having appeared in just three matches as the club was promoted again, he rescinded his contract.

On 16 July 2020, Campos signed for C.D. Mafra in the second tier. A year later, he moved to G.D. Chaves of the same league.

References

External links

1993 births
Living people
Sportspeople from Funchal
Portuguese footballers
Madeiran footballers
Association football defenders
Primeira Liga players
Liga Portugal 2 players
C.D. Nacional players
C.D. Mafra players
G.D. Chaves players
S.C.U. Torreense players